The fifteenth season of the American comedy television series It's Always Sunny in Philadelphia premiered on FXX on December 1 and concluded on December 22, 2021. This season had next day availability on FX on Hulu and FXNOW. The season consists of eight episodes and makes the series the longest-running live-action comedy series in American television history, surpassing The Adventures of Ozzie and Harriet.

Cast

Main cast
 Charlie Day as Charlie Kelly
 Glenn Howerton as Dennis Reynolds
 Rob McElhenney as Ronald "Mac" McDonald
 Kaitlin Olson as Dee Reynolds
 Danny DeVito as Frank Reynolds

Special guest star
Colm Meaney as Shelley Kelly

Recurring cast
 Mary Elizabeth Ellis as The Waitress
 Artemis Pebdani as Artemis
 Sandy Martin as Mrs. Mac

Guest stars
 Brian Huskey as Gary
 Geoffrey Owens as "Don Cheadle"
 Mark Prendergast as Gus

Production
The series was renewed for a fifteenth season in May 2020, making it the longest-running live-action comedy series in American television history, replacing The Adventures of Ozzie and Harriet, which ran for 14 seasons between 1952 and 1966. On April 9, 2020, Rob McElhenney announced that writing had begun for season 15. Filming for the season began in May 2021 and wrapped that October. Despite teases that the Ireland arc was shot in Dublin, Ireland, in August and September 2021, the final four episodes of the season were instead shot at Bodega Bay, California due to COVID-19 restrictions in Ireland.

The season is the first not to be distributed by 20th Television and instead is distributed by Disney-ABC Domestic Television due to the Disney-FOX merger in December 2017.

Episodes

Reception

Critical response 
On Rotten Tomatoes, the season has an approval rating of 100% with an average score of 9/10 based on 6 reviews, the highest rating since season 11.

Ratings

References

External links
 
 

It's Always Sunny in Philadelphia
2021 American television seasons
Television shows about the COVID-19 pandemic